The Inter City Football League was formed in 1899 in Scotland as one of several supplementary football leagues that were created in order to increase the number of fixtures for Scottish Football League clubs.

The founder members of the league were Celtic, Queen's Park, Rangers and Third Lanark (who had previously played supplementary fixtures in the Glasgow Football League) plus Heart of Midlothian and Hibernian (who in addition to the Inter City League continued to play supplementary matches in the Edinburgh / East of Scotland Football League). In 1902 Dundee, Partick Thistle and St Mirren joined and this remained the league's line-up until it disbanded in 1904.

Champions

1899–1900 Celtic
1900–01 Third Lanark
1901–02 Heart of Midlothian
1902–03 Heart of Midlothian
1903–04 unfinished
1904–05 unfinished
1905–06 Dundee

See also
Scottish Football (Defunct Leagues)

References

Defunct football leagues in Scotland
1899 establishments in Scotland
Sports leagues established in 1899
Sports leagues disestablished in 1904
1904 disestablishments in Scotland

he:ליגות כדורגל מוספות#ליגת הכדורגל הבין-עירונית